"Light My Fire" is a single by Japanese electronica/rock band Boom Boom Satellites. It was released in the UK only on the 'Different Records' label from the UK-only variant of their Photon album. It was released as a standard 12" vinyl and also as a promotional CD. Both versions contain "Sloughin' Blue" from the band's Umbra album as the second track, perhaps  indicating the release was intended to promote the band themselves in Europe rather than a particular album.

Track listing

References

External links 
 
 'Light My Fire' on Discogs.com

2003 songs
Boom Boom Satellites songs